Forever Friends may refer to:

 Forever Friends (brand), a teddy bear-themed brand of Hallmark Cards
 Forever Friends (film), a 1996 Taiwanese comedy war film
 "Forever Friends" (song), a song written for the 2008 Summer Olympics

See also
 Friends Forever (disambiguation)